Isola della Bocca Lighthouse is an active lighthouse located on a 
small islet, at the southern entrance of the outer Port of Olbia,  from the mainland, in the municipality of Olbia on the Tyrrhenian Sea.

Description
The tower and the lantern are painted white and the lantern dome in grey metallic. The lighthouse is completely automated and managed by the Marina Militare with the identification code number 1170 E.F.

See also
 List of lighthouses in Italy

References

External links

 Servizio Fari Marina Militare

Isola Bocca
Isola Bocca
Isola Bocca
Isola Bocca
Isola Bocca